Mergen (Old Turkic: 𐰢𐰼𐰏𐰤) is a Turkic deity of abundance and wisdom. Mergen is often depicted with a bow and arrow in one hand. Other important symbols include a white horse and the color white. He is associated with profundity and depicted as a strong and powerful god. Mergen is the son of Kayra and the brother of Ulgan, and lives on the seventh floor of sky. He was portrayed as a young man with a helmet and a bow riding on a white horse. Mergen symbolizes intelligence and thought.

Etymology
The word Mergen means archer or bowman in Turkic languages. In the Bashkir language the word märgän (мәргән) means marksman or sniper, while in Khalkha the cognate Mergen (мэргэн) means wise or genius.

See also
 Zasa Mergen Baatar

References

Bibliography
 Sarangerel (Julie Ann Stewart) : Chosen by the Spirits : Following Your Shamanic Calling. Destiny Books, Rochester (VT), 2001.

External links
 The Gods of Turks
 Алтайская мифология 
 Сибирский шаманизм 
 Mergen Tanrı

Turkic deities
Wisdom gods